Hypoptopoma gulare is a species of catfish in the family Loricariidae. It is native to the Amazon and Ucayali basins in South America. It reaches 10.5 cm (4.1 inches) SL. It is sometimes seen in the aquarium trade, where it is referred to as the giant otocinclus, despite not belonging to the genus Otocinclus.

References 

Hypoptopomatini
Fish described in 1878
Taxa named by Edward Drinker Cope